The 2015–16 Montana State Bobcats men's basketball team represented Montana State University during the 2015–16 NCAA Division I men's basketball season. The Bobcats, led by second year head coach Brian Fish, played their home games at Worthington Arena and were members of the Big Sky Conference. They finished the season 14–17, 9–9 in Big Sky play to finish in seventh place. They lost in the first round of the Big Sky tournament to Sacramento State.

Previous season
The Bobcats finished the season 7–23, 4–14 in Big Sky play to finish in a three-way tie for tenth place. They failed to qualify for the Big Sky tournament.

Departures

Incoming Transfers

2015 incoming recruits

Roster

Schedule

|-
!colspan=9 style="background:#0a1f62; color:#c1b465;"| Exhibition

|-
!colspan=9 style="background:#0a1f62; color:#c1b465;"| Non-conference regular season

|-
!colspan=9 style="background:#0a1f62; color:#c1b465;"| Big Sky regular season

|-
!colspan=9 style="background:#0a1f62; color:#c1b465;"| Big Sky tournament

See also
2015–16 Montana State Bobcats women's basketball team

References

Montana State Bobcats men's basketball seasons
Montana State
Bob
Bob